The Torneo Metropolitano de Hockey Masculino is a men's field hockey competition contested by clubs of the Buenos Aires Province in  Argentina. Played since 1908, it is regulated by the Buenos Aires Hockey Association (AHBA).

Formula
The Torneo Metropolitano is one of the country's two main club competitions; the other is the Liga Nacional de Hockey (LHN) played by teams not only from Buenos Aires but from the rest of Argentina.

The championship is disputed by 14 teams that play double round-robin basis in which every team plays all others in its league once at home and once away. At the end of the season, the six teams best placed in the table are allowed to dispute the playoffs, where two teams will be eliminated. The next stage is the semi-finals, and then the final match.

Current teams (2022) 

Notes

List of champions 
The chart below includes all the titles won by men's teams. In brackets, number of titles won until that date:

Titles by club 
Club Ferrocarril General Mitre has won the most titles (18 championships), followed by Quilmes with 16 titles.

Notes

References

External links
 Official website

1908 establishments in Argentina
Field hockey leagues in Argentina
Sports competitions in Buenos Aires
Sports leagues established in 1908